Sphaenothecus bilineatus, the double-banded bycid, is a species of long-horned beetle in the family Cerambycidae.

References

Further reading

External links

 

Trachyderini
Beetles described in 1831